Christ Church is located in Woking, England. The church is in the Diocese of Guildford.

History

In the 1870s, Woking's population was growing rapidly. Services for the population were being held in the back room of a local shop, though the congregation was too large by 1877. A church hall known as the 'Iron Room' was constructed to accommodate for the growing congregation. The Iron Room was on the site of the current church. It could seat approximately 400 people.

The London Necropolis Railway had begun to sell off a lot of land, and a section of this was reserved "for a church, vicarage and burial ground". Furthermore, a plot of land had also been acquired in 1861 for the church (the Iron Room and modern church were built on this site).

On 11 February 1885, it was agreed a new church would be built and would cost between £4,000 and £5,000. The reason for this was because of overcrowding in the Iron Room.

Christ Church was started in 1887; the first stone was laid by the Duchess of Albany. The church held its first service on New Years Day 1889 and was completed in 1908 after the transepts and morning chapel were finished.

In recent years the church has undergone a series of developments, including the addition of a café and bookshop.

References

Further reading
Pevsner, Nikolaus "Buildings of England: Surrey" (1982 ed.) p. 533

Woking
Woking
1887 establishments in England
Diocese of Guildford